Guinea competed at the 2020 Summer Olympics in Tokyo. Originally scheduled to take place from 24 July to 9 August 2020, the Games were postponed to 23 July to 8 August 2021, because of the COVID-19 pandemic. It was the nation's twelfth appearance at the Summer Olympics since its debut in 1968. Guinea failed to register any athletes at the 1972 Summer Olympics in Munich and eventually joined the rest of the African nations to boycott the 1976 Summer Olympics in Montreal. On 22 July, the eve of the opening ceremony, Guinea announced it would withdraw from the Games due to COVID-19 concerns, but later reversed its decision.

Competitors
The following is a list of the number of competitors that will participate in the Games.

Athletics

Guinea received a universality slot from the World Athletics to send a female athlete to the Olympics.

Track & road events

Judo
 
Guinea received an invitation from the Tripartite Commission and the International Judo Federation to send Mamadou Samba Bah in the men's lightweight category (73 kg) to the Olympics.

Swimming

Guinea received a universality invitation from FINA to send two top-ranked swimmers (one per gender) in their respective individual events to the Olympics, based on the FINA Points System of June 28, 2021.

Wrestling

For the first time since Seoul 1988, Guinea qualified one wrestler for the women's freestyle 57 kg into the Olympic competition, by progressing to the top two finals at the 2021 African & Oceania Qualification Tournament in Hammamet, Tunisia.

Freestyle

See also
Guinea at the 2020 Summer Paralympics

References

Nations at the 2020 Summer Olympics
2020
2021 in Guinean sport